John Billingsley (born May 20, 1960) is an American actor best known for his role as Doctor Phlox on the television series Star Trek: Enterprise.

Early life and education
Billingsley was born in Media, Pennsylvania, and subsequently lived in Huntsville, Alabama and Slidell, Louisiana before his family settled in Weston, Connecticut. He graduated from Bennington College in 1982.

Career

Early work
Billingsley's first on-screen role was in 1991 as a difficult customer making a return in a customer service training video produced by Nintendo of America. He made an appearance in "It Happened in Juneau", a third-season episode of the TV comedy-drama Northern Exposure, playing a patient treated by Marilyn. He then appeared in The X-Files episode "Three of a Kind", as a friend of the Lone Gunmen who turns out to be a government spy. He played Bill Gates in a sketch on Seattle comedy show Almost Live! One of Billingsley's earliest film roles was in the 2001 made-for-television historical drama Just Ask My Children, in which he played corrupt lawyer Andrew Gines.

2000s
Billingsley played Dr. John Fallow in a West Wing episode that featured the Gall–Peters projection map (season 2, episode 16). He was cast as Professor Miles Ballard in the short-lived television series The Others; then as the Denobulan Doctor Phlox in the fifth live-action Star Trek series, Star Trek: Enterprise, which ran for four seasons. He also played himself in an episode of Roswell that used the Enterprise set. He also starred in the independent film Breathing Hard (2000) in the same year. In 2002, he was a guest star in an episode of Stargate SG-1, playing a scientist who is also a Trekkie, "worshipping at the altar of Roddenberry". He played a supporting role in the 2003 thriller Out of Time as medical examiner and best friend to the chief of police, played by Denzel Washington.

Billingsley is well known to fans of the series Cold Case for his guest appearance in the show's second season, playing serial killer George Marks, the only killer on the show to get away with murder. He reprised the role in the season finale, in which Marks was killed. He also appeared as a blunt-force victim in the first season of Six Feet Under, in the episode "The New Person".

Billingsley appeared in the first season of the series Prison Break as the mysterious Terrence Steadman, brother of the Vice President, whose death is faked to frame Lincoln Burrows for murder. Soon after, he was cast as a regular on the series The Nine. This left him unable to continue his role as Steadman, and he was replaced in the role by Jeff Perry. In 2005, he played the voice of Trask in Ultimate Spider-Man. In November 2006, Billingsley portrayed William Bradford on two episodes of the podcast The Radio Adventures of Dr. Floyd. In May 2007 he appeared on NCIS as a blind photographer in the episode, "In The Dark". He appeared in the seventh season of 24 as a recurring character. On October 8, 2007, he also made a guest appearance on Journeyman as Alan Platt. Billingsley played Prof. Harry, a biologist, in the 2007 independent science fiction film The Man from Earth, as well as the 2013 sequel ‘’The Man from Earth: Holocene’’. He also made a guest appearance in an October 2007 episode of CSI: Crime Scene Investigation, and in 2006 on the spinoff series CSI: NY.

Billingsley appeared as Jacob Nolston in "Crash Into Me", a two-part, fourth-season episode of the TV drama Grey's Anatomy.

Billingsley and his wife have also appeared as themselves on the HGTV series My House Is Worth What?, in which a real estate expert toured their home and provided commentary for viewers before providing an appraisal.

In 2008, Billingsley had a supporting role in several episodes of the HBO series True Blood as coroner Mike Spencer. In May of that year, he guest starred as John Harris, the father of the Kiss-Me-Not Killer, in "Never Tell", an episode of Women's Murder Club.

He appeared in the disaster film 2012, which was released on November 13, 2009, as Professor Frederic West, an American scientist. He subsequently appeared on the ABC series Scrubs in December 2009.

2010s
In August 2010, Billingsley guest starred in an episode of the TNT series Leverage as Coswell, the head of security at the Boston Museum of Art and Antiquities. In November that year he guest starred as amateur psychic Ellis Mars in "Red Moon", an episode of The Mentalist.

In February 2011 Billingsley played Gidger in the Richard Greenberg's play The Violet Hour in Los Angeles. In August 2011, Billingsley starred in an episode of the USA Network drama Suits as the company accountant who is being released for never finishing university.

In October 2012 Billingsley starred in the film Trade of Innocents alongside Dermot Mulroney and Mira Sorvino.

On February 12, 2013, a web comedy video was released on Yahoo! Screens under the title "Forwarders" that featured Billingsley as an Dr. Alan Cooper, a psychologist and expert on compulsive e-mail forwarding. That same year he completed filming of the independent film Red Line.

On January 7, 2014, CBS television premiered the science fiction drama Intelligence, on which Billingsley played Dr. Shenandoah Cassidy, the inventor of an implantable microchip that acts as an interface between a human mind and electronic devices.

In November 2014, Billingsley guest-starred in the CBS crime drama series, Hawaii Five-0, playing lawyer Eugene Goodman in the Season 5 episode, "Ka Hana Malu".

In May 2015, Billingsley appeared in the second season of the AMC period drama, Turn: Washington's Spies, playing Samuel Townsend, father of American Revolutionary spy, Robert Townsend. He later returned to the role for the third season.

In July 2017, he appeared as Doctor Ben in the Showtime revival of Twin Peaks.

Personal life
Billingsley is married to fellow actor Bonita Friedericy. She first became interested in him after seeing him perform in a stage production of Great Expectations. Friedericy appeared with Billingsley in "Regeneration", a 2003 episode of Star Trek: Enterprise in which she played Rooney. The couple has subsequently appeared in other productions together.

Filmography

Film

Television

Videogames

References

External links

 
 
 

1960 births
Living people
People from Media, Pennsylvania
American male film actors
American male television actors
Bennington College alumni
Male actors from Pennsylvania
People from Greater Los Angeles
Male actors from Seattle
20th-century American male actors
21st-century American male actors
People from Slidell, Louisiana
People from Weston, Connecticut